The Szczekociny rail crash occurred on 3 March 2012 when two passenger trains collided head-on near the town of Szczekociny, Silesian Voivodeship, Poland. Sixteen people died in the incident and 58 were injured. An investigative report showed that the cause of the crash was due to human error by train dispatchers and the train drivers.

Incident
At around 20:55 CET on 3 March 2012, two passenger trains (totalling approximately 350 passengers in 10 carriages) collided at Chałupki near the Silesian Voivodship town of Szczekociny. At the time, scheduled engineering works were underway on the track at Szczekociny railway station. A spokesman from Polish State Railways said that as a result of this, the Kraków-bound train was "on the wrong track". The InterRegio train was hauled by Class ET22 locomotive 1105, and the Intercity by Class EP09-035.

Because of the collision, one carriage of the northbound Warsaw train telescoped, and other carriages derailed. One eyewitness described carriages colliding like a concertina.

One third of the EP09-035 engine room, along with both cabins, was completely destroyed. Locomotive ET22-1105 had one cabin (the front one) destroyed and rotated 180° as a result of collision.

Casualties
Officials announced that the incident resulted in 16 fatalities and 58 injuries. There were two foreigners among fatalities: an American woman, and a Russian national. On 6 March 2012, Polish newspaper Gazeta Wyborcza reported that the drivers of both trains and a number of train staff died in the incident.

Six Ukrainians, one Moldovan and one Czech were among the injured. Szymon Nowak, a doctor in a nearby hospital, stated that a number of the casualties were in a serious condition; some were in medically induced comas. The casualties were reported as having a variety of injuries including broken arms and legs, pelvic and spinal fractures, as well as facial and internal injuries.  One 29-year-old female casualty had a leg amputated.

The rescue operation involved approximately 450 firemen and 120 police officers. 35 ambulances and 2 air ambulances took casualties to a number of hospitals, including those in Piekary Śląskie, Myszków, Częstochowa, Zawiercie, Katowice, Sosnowiec, Dąbrowa Górnicza and Bytom.

As of 8 March 2012, 39 people remained in hospital. Of these, 4 remained in intensive care.

Investigation
On 4 March 2012, Polish prosecutors opened an investigation into the incident. The following day, the Associated Press reported that one prosecutor, Tomasz Ozimek, was seeking to press charges against a railroad traffic controller. Ozimek alleges that the controller's error resulted in one of the trains moving onto the wrong track. It was announced at a press conference in Częstochowa that two people were detained, without charge, including the controller, who is in psychiatric care suffering from shock. The second person, a female dispatcher, was released on 6 March without charge.

By 8 March, the line reopened after reconstruction work. Polskie Radio reported that PKP acknowledged prior knowledge of faulty points on the line. TVN, one of Polish TV networks, has published information that the points and signals on the line had been faulty 65 times between 30 November 2011 (the day the line was put back in use after modernization) and the day of the crash.

The investigation revealed that a series of mistakes caused the collision: 
 The day before the crash, the dispatcher in Starzyny sent another train on the wrong track. The investigation team (PKBWK) should have been notified and the dispatcher relieved of his duties, but the national rail infrastructure manager, PKP PLK, did neither of these
 On the day of the crash, a switch in Starzyny had malfunctioned and the train dispatcher (the same who sent the train on the wrong track the day before) had used a subsidiary signal, sending the southbound train (IR 13126 Matejko) on a wrong track, without informing the driver with rozkaz pisemny about the cause of subsidiary signal
 Train dispatcher in Starzyny did not observe the train and informed dispatcher in Sprowa that the train was on the correct track
 The interREGIO driver did not stop the train after entering the wrong track, as he should do because the subsidiary signal did not have additional W24 sign underneath
 As interREGIO has entered the wrong track, the signalling in Sprowa has informed train dispatcher about the fact that the track is occupied, but because of Starzyny' dispatcher giving wrong information, she presumed that the signalling has malfunctioned and used subsidiary signal too, sending northbound TLK 31100 Brzechwa on correct but occupied track
 The TLK driver also did not stop the train after passing the signal, as he should do because the subsidiary signal did have additional W24 sign underneath. 

The official report was issued on 15 February 2013.

Reactions

The President, Bronislaw Komorowski, declared two days of mourning beginning on Monday 5 March. Polish Prime Minister Donald Tusk said that the incident was "[Poland's] most tragic train disaster in many, many years", referring to the 1990 Ursus accident, and that it was too soon to speculate what caused the Szczekociny collision. Tusk added that human error could not be excluded from the lines of enquiry.

Slawomir Nowak, the Minister of Transport, insisted that Polish rail travel was safe and that safety is a priority.  He added that people planning to travel on the Polish railway system during Euro 2012 need not worry, stating that he believes that "the train system – not only in Poland but all of Europe – is still very safe".

Pope Benedict XVI wrote to Archbishop Józef Michalik expressing condolences, stating that it was "with pain [he received] the news of the train crash".  He gave all casualties of the incident his "apostolic blessing" and said that he was praying for the victims and their families.

German Chancellor Angela Merkel and Foreign Minister Guido Westerwelle also sent Tusk and the victims' families their condolences. President of Slovakia Ivan Gašparovič – along with Prime Minister Iveta Radičová and Foreign Minister Mikuláš Dzurinda – gave their sympathy to the families and relatives of the incident's victims. Prime Minister of the Czech Republic Petr Nečas wrote to "express [his] grief over every human life that has perished in the disaster". Andrius Kubilius, the Prime Minister of Lithuania, wished Poland "the strength required in those moments of grief and mourning". Prime Minister of Hungary Viktor Orbán wrote to Tusk to reassure him that the "Hungarian people are joining [their] Polish friends in mourning". Boyko Borisov, the Prime Minister of Bulgaria, sent his "most sincere condolences to the families and relatives of the victims", stating that the Bulgarian people "join [them] in pain". The Prime Minister of Singapore Lee Hsien Loong wrote a letter to Tusk, expressing his "deepest condolences to the people of Poland".

See also

List of rail accidents (2010–2019)
List of Poland disasters by death toll
Tempi train crash

References

2012 disasters in Poland
2012 in Poland
Articles containing video clips
History of Silesian Voivodeship
March 2012 events in Europe
Railway accidents in 2012
Train collisions in Poland
Zawiercie County